The Worcestershire Senior Urn (officially The Worcestershire Football Association Senior Invitation Urn) is a football competition for Worcestershire County FA club teams, organized by the Worcestershire County Football Association. It began in the 1973–74 season with Malvern Town taking the honours in the first final.

The Senior Urn is the less senior of the county's two main cups, and at present entry is restricted to those clubs which are affiliated to the County FA and compete in the highest division of the Midland Football Alliance, West Midlands (Regional) League, Midland Football Combination and Hellenic League.  Clubs from higher leagues compete in the Worcestershire Senior Cup.

Winners
The winners of the Urn have been as follows:
1973–74 Malvern Town
1974–75 Malvern Town
1975–76 Malvern Town
1976–77 Evesham United
1977–78 Evesham United
1978–79 Malvern Town
1979–80 Oldswinford
1980–81 Bromsgrove Rovers
1981–82 Ledbury Town
1982–83 Oldswinford
1983–84 Malvern Town
1984–85 West Midlands Police
1985–86 Pegasus Juniors
1986–87 Oldbury United
1987–88 Kings Heath
1988–89 Kidderminster Harriers Reserves
1989–90 Malvern Town
1990–91 West Midlands Police
1991–92 West Midlands Police
1992–93 Stourport Swifts
1993–94 Stourport Swifts
1994–95 Stourport Swifts
1995–96 Pershore Town
1996–97 Kings Heath
1997–98 Stourport Swifts
1998–99 Kings Norton Town
1999–00 Malvern Town
2000–01 Studley
2001–02 Studley
2002–03 Studley
2003–04 Alvechurch
2004–05 Alvechurch
2005–06 Worcester City Reserves
2006–07 Barnt Green Spartak
2007–08 Alvechurch
2008–09 Bewdley Town
2009–10 Alvechurch
2010–11 Bewdley Town
2011–12 Bewdley Town
2012–13 Alvechurch
2013–14 Lye Town
2014–15 Malvern Town
2015–16 Alvechurch
2016–17 Bromsgrove Sporting
2017-18 Bromsgrove Sporting

References

County Cup competitions
Football in Worcestershire
Recurring sporting events established in 1973